Lisanne Falk (born December 3, 1964) is an American former actress and film producer. She is best known for her role as Heather McNamara in the 1988 film Heathers.

Career
Falk is a former child model who worked at the Ford Modeling Agency with a young Brooke Shields. She portrays the seemingly upset young woman in a men's restroom on the cover of Foreigner's 1979 album Head Games. Her modeling work was featured in the book Lisanne: A Young Model.

She played the role of Heather McNamara in the black comedy film Heathers (1988) alongside Winona Ryder.

Filmography

Film

Television

References

External links
 

1964 births
American emigrants to England
American expatriates in England
American film actresses
Actresses from New York (state)
Child models
Female models from New York (state)
Living people
People from Long Beach, New York